The Carolina, Knoxville and Western Railway was a South Carolina railroad that existed in the latter half of the 19th century.

The Carolina, Knoxville and Western Railway was formed in 1887 to build a line from Augusta Georgia to Knoxville, Tennessee. Financing was accomplished through bond sales.

The company was consolidated in 1887, with the Carolina, Knoxville and Western Railway Company, the Pennsylvania and Haywood Railroad Company and the Atlantic, Greenville and Western Railway Company joining under the Carolina, Knoxville and Western Railway moniker.

The newly formed company was to build a line from Augusta, Georgia, to Knoxville, Tennessee. About 14 miles of rail was laid between Greenville, South Carolina, and Marietta, South Carolina, and considerably more grading completed before work was suspended after the failure of the Georgia Construction and Investment Co., which had the contract to construct the entire road.

The C, K&W railway  was intended to bring coal from Tennessee to South Carolina and on to Augusta, as well a to provide a direct line over the mountains. On September 5, 1897, Transylvania County's Board of Commissioners committed $50,000 toward the construction of the railroad, as described in the minutes of the Board, transcribed below:

Page 387 of minutes of the Board of Commissioners, Sept. 5, 1887
Hence there was a contract presented to the Board of County Commissioners by the Carolina, Knoxville and Western Railroad authorities. Whereupon the Board after carefully examining said contract, it was observed that said contract all the facts and particulars examined in the previous proceeding had and made by said Board in reference to said Railroad vis by way of subscription to the Capital Stock petitions to the Board order for an election and result of the election and amount to be subscribed. Whereupon said Board signed said contract or agreement.
See Page 390 of these minutes.

 Page 390 of minutes of the Board of Commissioners, Sept. 5, 1887
 State of North Carolina §
 Transylvania County     §
  Whereas the Board of Commissioners of Transylvania County of North Carolina at a regular session of said Commissioner's Court held on the 5th day of September 1887 proposed to take fifty thousand dollars ($50,000) stock of the Carolina, Knoxville and Western Railway Company and pay for the same in bonds of the County of Transylvania, the principle to be paid in thirty years after issue, and the interest annually at a rate of interest of six percent per annum, interest to paid at the office of the Treasurer of Transylvania County. Said Bonds not to be turned over to the said Railroad company or in any way be a debt against the County of Transylvania until a line of Railroad is located and graded through the County of Transylvania. Said road crossing the French Broad River eight or ten miles above or Southwest of Brevard, and having a depot established within one mile of the Court House in Brevard and also until satisfactory guarantee be given by the said Company or their assigns that the track will be laid and regular trains be in running order and actually running over said road and on the further condition that the actual construction of said road shall in good faith be commenced within six months from the date of the subscription and regular trains be running on said road within two years and six months from the date of subscription.
And whereas at said session of said Commissioner's Court it was ordered an election on the 8th day of October 1887 be held at the various precincts in said county under the laws and regulations prescribed for holding elections for the purpose of electing members of the General Assembly, to determine whether the said proposed subscription by said Commissioners shall be authorized and confirmed and ordering that if a majority of the qualified voters of said county should vote subscription, that it should be the duty of the Board of Commissioners of said County of Transylvania for and account of the County of Transylvania to subscribe to sum of fifty thousand dollars to the capital stock of the Carolina, Knoxville and Western Railway Company upon the conditions and limitations herein expressed, and should issue the bonds as herein provided for said proposed subscription being done duly and regularly as required by the statute in such cases; and whereas said election was duly and regularly held, and the proposed subscription was confirmed, ratified and ordered by a majority of the qualified voters of said County and the result of said election has been duly and regularly declared, adjudged and entered of Record at a special session of said Commissioner's Court of said County of Transylvania held on the 10th day of October 1887.
Now therefore in consideration of the premises and by virtue of the power vested in said Commissioner's Court of Transylvania County State of North Carolina for and account of said County of Transylvania through their Chairman do hereby subscribe for five hundred shares of the Capital Stock of the Carolina, Knoxville and Western Railway Company – each a share being the face value of one hundred (500) dollars and do hereby bind said County of Transylvania to issue in payment for said five hundred (500) shares of said stock bonds of said County to the amount of fifty thousand ($50000.00) Dollars in payment for said Stock, upon the conditions and limitations herein before fully expressed in said order of said Commissioner's Court made September 5, 1887.
 Which order is hereby made apart of this order of subscription. In witness whereof the Board of Commissioners of Transylvania County State of North Carolina have hereunto signed their names and caused the official seal of the Court of Commissioners of said Transylvania County to be hereunto affixed and have caused these presents to be signed by the Clerk of said Board of Commissioners at a regular session held on this the 2nd day of January 1888.
  L. W. Brooks Chair B.C.C., J. A. Galloway, T. L. Gash
 { SEAL of Clerk County Commissioners Transylvania Co. N. C. }

By November 1888 the railroad had been completed from Greenville, South Carolina to Marietta,  some 15 miles. The line was later extended another 8 miles to River Falls. The 1895 map of Greenville County, South Carolina, is interesting because it shows the C.K. & W. RR as completed from Greenville to a point north of Marietta.  The railroad's intent was to continue the line up the Jones Gap road, along what is now highway-276 up behind what is now the Connestee Falls community, through the Walnut Hollow gap and northward, crossing Pisgah Ridge via a tunnel at what is now known as Tunnel Gap on the Blue Ridge Parkway, finally reaching the coal fields of Tennessee.

1888 was a busy year for The Carolina, Knoxville & Western Railway in Transylvania County. right-of-way was acquiredi and cleared along what is now highway-276, behind Connestee Falls, around and above the Walnut Hollow valley behind what is now the Gwen Valley Camp. Remnants of the partially constructed right-of-way remain visible in 2015. The  right-of-way veered from the  into what is now the Connestee Falls community just south of the main gate. The right-of-way is clearly visible behind the administration office. From there it climbed and was to cross a 50 foot high  trestle above Batson Falls, where blasting was required to construct the right-of-way through solid rock.

By 1894 the railroad was already insolvent with its former President, Joseph B. Humbert, filing a lawsuit to try and recover his unpaid salaryi. By 1899 it was fully abandoned.

The Transylvania County portion of the Carolina, Knoxville & Western Railway remained forever dead except for a very faint glimmer of hope in 1911 when Brevard's mayor went to Greenville and purchased its right-of-way. Nothing came of it but it was probably inspired by renewed interest in transporting Tennessee's coal to South Carolina. The much publicized interest of that time even brought the Coca-Cola magnate, Asa Candler, and other Atlanta "capitalists" to Brevardii. 
In 1907 the Greenville & Knoxville Railroad was formed to revive the South Carolina portion of the railroad. It operated until 1914 when it was reorganized as the Greenville & Western, which was renamed Greenville & Northern in 1920. The line was cut back to Travelers Rest in the mid 1950s.iii
Remnants of the South Carolina portion of the Carolina, Knoxville & Western Railway1 are still visible alongside highway 276, especially around Marietta. The rails were present until 2006, when they were removed.

A receiver was appointed for the Carolina, Knoxville and Western Railway in 1891, and in 1899 the portion of the property to which reference has already been made was conveyed by deed to the carrier.

The Carolina, Knoxville and Western Railway was unsuccessful and the line was abandoned sometime after 1899, until 1907, when the Greenville and Knoxville Railroad was formed to reopen the route.

In 1914 the railroad once again reorganized, this time as the Greenville and Western Railroad. It was renamed the Greenville and Northern six years later. The line was purchased by the Pinsly Railroad Company in 1957.

References

Defunct South Carolina railroads
Railway companies established in 1878
Railway companies disestablished in 1885
American companies disestablished in 1885
American companies established in 1878